Wally Green (born 1979) is an American table tennis player. He has played for the U.S. in more than 35 International Pro Tour competitions.

Early life
Green grew up in a low-income housing project in Brooklyn, New York. He became part of a gang and his juvenile rap sheet included car jacking and gun possession. He says that he grew up with domestic violence, and that he owned six guns when he was 13 years old. In New York he went to Lafayette High School, and his father, who was from Nigeria, sent him to boarding school in Nigeria for a time. At Lafayette, he played basketball, football and volleyball.

Table tennis
Green started playing table tennis due to a chance encounter at a pool hall, and discovered that other black kids played the game. Playing sports was also a way to avoid his step-father. He found a mentor, who paid for him to train in Hanover, Germany. He played his first International Table Tennis Federation (ITTF) game as global pro in 2001 in Germany. During the following years, he didn't win a lot, but he traveled globally, camera crews noticed him and Rockstar Games became his sponsor. According to The New York Times, he "brought charisma and showmanship" to the sport. He won his first international match in the 2009 Korea Open.

In 2015 he decided to participate as the only Westerner in the Pyongyang Open in North Korea. He said later that "I wanted the North Koreans to realize that Americans aren't their enemies" and, about playing in front of 5,000 North Koreans, that "You can feel the eyes of everyone looking at you because you're very different ... It's the most eerie, like really strange, feeling."

Green stopped competing internationally in 2016. His record in ITTF events is one match won in singles, and two in doubles. In 2018 he said "I'm not the best player in the world, but I'm definitely the coolest. I'm sure of it. That beats being the best." He credits table tennis with saving his life.

Other activities

Green was involved in the promotion of the 2006 Rockstar Games Presents Table Tennis in Tokyo, and provided motion capture for one of the game's characters.  In 2009, he co-founded the  table tennis franchise SPiN with, among others, Susan Sarandon. On his initiative, table tennis tables were installed in Bryant Park in New York City, initially as marketing for SPiN. In 2022, he was featured in Unanimous Media's The Greatest Sports Stories Never Told.

Personal life
Green suffered from pain for several years, and underwent hip resurfacing in 2018. As of 2022, he is married to a Japanese pop singer. They live in Harlem and have a son.

See also
Ping-pong diplomacy

References

External links

Green Wally at Table Tennis Guide
German Open 2013 Highlights: Liang Jingkun vs Wally Green, World Table Tennis video
The first-person story of how ping pong saved the life of a New York City kid and took him all the way to North Korea New York Daily News, 2018, by Wally Green
Taking ping pong from losing, to winning, to diplomacy in North Korea - Wally Green, 2022 TEDx video

Living people
1979 births
American male table tennis players
20th-century African-American sportspeople
21st-century African-American sportspeople